Reproductive value may refer to several ideas:
Reproductive value (social psychology), the attributes of a potential partner in mate selection
Reproductive value (population genetics), the contribution of an individual to the future generations